Mud Lake Delta Provincial Park is a provincial park in British Columbia, Canada, located in the North Thompson Country due east of Blue River, 230 km from Kamloops on BC Highway 5.

References

BC Parks page

External links

Provincial parks of British Columbia
Thompson Country
1996 establishments in British Columbia
Protected areas established in 1996